Lleida Old Town is a district of Lleida, Catalonia, Spain. As of 2008 it had a population of 10,659 people.

References

Neighbourhoods of Lleida
Historic districts in Spain